Radovan Miletić (Serbian: Радован Милетић (пуковник); Požarevac, Principality of Serbia, 12 January 1844 – Belgrade, Kingdom of Serbia, 1919) was a Serbian army colonel and geographer. He fought in 1885 in the Serbo-Bulgarian War, commanding the Timok Division in the rank of colonel under the leadership of Milojko Lešjanin. He also served as Minister of the Army of Serbia in the Ministry of Defence from 11 February 1891 to 7 May 1891. He was succeeded by Jovan Praporčetović. 

Radovan Miletić was born on 12 January 1844 in Požarevac. He completed his undergraduate degree at Visaka škola and military schooling at the Military Academy before pursuing further studies in Vienna, where he graduated from the Geography Department in 1872.

In 1880, the Ministry of National Economy founded a commission to establish a Geography Department in the headquarters of the Serbian General Staffunder the direction of Staff Colonel Radovan Miletić who performed the first topographic survey of the entire Kingdom of Serbia from 1881 to 1892 with a team composed of customs officer Kosta Stefanović, engineers Miša Marković and Svetozar Zorić of the Ministry of Engineering.

From 23 February 1891 Colonel Radovan Miletić and Andra Nikolić were elected ministers in the cabinet of Nikola Pašić until 22 August 1892.

Radovan Miletić in his career held the posts of Chief of Staff, Colonel of the  General Staff, Chief of the Geographical Department, Chief of the General Staff.

He died in 1919 as a retired politician and officer.

References 

1844 births
1919 deaths
People from Požarevac
Military personnel from Belgrade
University of Vienna alumni
Serbian geographers
19th-century Serbian people
20th-century Serbian people
People of the Serbo-Bulgarian War
Defence ministers of Serbia
Date of death missing